Andreas Schopf (born April 9, 1984) is an Austrian luger who has competed since 2000. A natural track luger, he won four medals at the FIL World Luge Natural Track Championships with two golds (Men's doubles: 2001, 2003) and two silvers (Men's doubles and mixed team: both 2009).

Schopf also won three medals at the FIL European Luge Natural Track Championships with two golds (men's doubles: 2002, mixed team: 2010) and a bronze (men's doubles: 2004).

References
 
 Natural track European Championships results 1970–2006.
 Natural track World Championships results: 1979–2007

External links
 

1984 births
Living people
Austrian male lugers